Terra Roxa is a municipality in the state of São Paulo in Brazil. The population is 9,437 (2020 est.) in an area of 222 km². The elevation is 494 m.

References

Municipalities in São Paulo (state)